Chochana Boukhobza (Sfax, March 2, 1959 – ) is an Israeli writer of Tunisian-Jewish descent. She was born in Sfax, Tunisia and emigrated to Israel at the age of 17. She studied mathematics in Israel.

She is the author of several novels, the first of which Un été à Jérusalem (A Summer in Jerusalem) won the Prix Mediterranée in 1986. Her second novel Le Cri was a finalist for the 1987 Prix Femina. She has also written several screenplays. In 2005, she co-directed a documentary Un billet aller-retour (A Return Ticket) (Barcelona-Paris Films Productions).

References

Israeli Jews
Israeli novelists
1959 births
Living people
People from Sfax
Tunisian emigrants to Israel
Israeli people of Tunisian-Jewish descent
Tunisian writers in French